Lycastus (Λύκαστος) may refer to:

Lycastus, a Cretan king and son of Minos I and Itone. He was the husband of Ida, daughter of Corybas, and by her father of Minos II.
Lycastus, twin brother of Parrhasius, whose parents were Ares and Phylonome, daughter of Nyctimus and Arcadia. Their mother was seduced by Ares in the guise of a shepherd; in fear of her father's wrath, she cast the newborn twins into the river Erymanthus. They did not drown and were washed into the hollow of an oak tree, where a she-wolf found and suckled them, giving up her own cubs. The twins were then adopted and raised by a shepherd named Gyliphus, and eventually succeeded to the throne of Arcadia. Their story is closely parallel, and is cited as such by Pseudo-Plutarch, to that of Romulus and Remus.
Lycastus, lover of Eulimene, who unsuccessfully attempted to save his loved one from being sacrificed.
Lycastus, an autochthon, eponym of the town Lycastus in Crete, which might as well have been named after the son of Minos.

Notes

References 

 Diodorus Siculus, The Library of History translated by Charles Henry Oldfather. Twelve volumes. Loeb Classical Library. Cambridge, Massachusetts: Harvard University Press; London: William Heinemann, Ltd. 1989. Vol. 3. Books 4.59–8. Online version at Bill Thayer's Web Site
 Diodorus Siculus, Bibliotheca Historica. Vol 1-2. Immanel Bekker. Ludwig Dindorf. Friedrich Vogel. in aedibus B. G. Teubneri. Leipzig. 1888-1890. Greek text available at the Perseus Digital Library.
 Lucius Mestrius Plutarchus, Moralia with an English Translation by Frank Cole Babbitt. Cambridge, MA. Harvard University Press. London. William Heinemann Ltd. 1936. Online version at the Perseus Digital Library. Greek text available from the same website.
 Parthenius, Love Romances translated by Sir Stephen Gaselee (1882-1943), S. Loeb Classical Library Volume 69. Cambridge, MA. Harvard University Press. 1916.  Online version at the Topos Text Project.
 Parthenius, Erotici Scriptores Graeci, Vol. 1. Rudolf Hercher. in aedibus B. G. Teubneri. Leipzig. 1858. Greek text available at the Perseus Digital Library.
 Stephanus of Byzantium, Stephani Byzantii Ethnicorum quae supersunt, edited by August Meineike (1790-1870), published 1849. A few entries from this important ancient handbook of place names have been translated by Brady Kiesling. Online version at the Topos Text Project.

Princes in Greek mythology
Kings of Crete
Children of Ares
Kings in Greek mythology
Autochthons of classical mythology
Cretan characters in Greek mythology